Brunstatt-Didenheim is a commune in the Haut-Rhin department of northeastern France. The municipality was established on 1 January 2016 and consists of the former communes of Brunstatt and Didenheim.

Population
The population data given in the table below refer to the commune in its geography as of January 2020.

See also 
Communes of the Haut-Rhin department

References 

Communes of Haut-Rhin